Thecobathra is a genus of moths of the family Yponomeutidae.

Species
Thecobathra acropercna - Meyrick, 1922 
Thecobathra anas - Stringer, 1930 
Thecobathra argophanes - Meyrick, 1907 
Thecobathra casta - Meyrick, 1907 
Thecobathra delias - Meyrick, 1913 
Thecobathra dilechria - Bradley, 1982 
Thecobathra eta - Moriuti, 1963 
Thecobathra kappa - Moriuti, 1963 
Thecobathra kurokoi - Moriuti, 1982 
Thecobathra lambda - Moriuti, 1963 
Thecobathra nakaoi - Moriuti, 1965 
Thecobathra nivalis - Moriuti, 1971 
Thecobathra sororiata - Moriuti, 1971 
Thecobathra yasudai - Moriuti, 1965

References 
 , 1980: A study of Chinese Thecobathra Meyrick (Lepidoptera: Yponomeutidae). Entomotaxonomia 2 (1): 33-40.
 , 1983: Two new species of Thecobathra Meyrick （Lepidoptera: Yponomeutidae). Acta Zootaxonomica Sinica 8(1): 80-83. Full article: .
 , 1984: One new species of Thecobathra Meyrick in Yunnan province (Lepidoptera: Tortricidae) a:Yponomeutidae). Acta Zootaxonomica Sinica 9(3): 324-325. Full article: .

Yponomeutidae